The 1971–72 Northern Premier League was the fourth season of the Northern Premier League, a regional football league in Northern England, the northern areas of the Midlands and North Wales. The season began on 14 August 1971 and concluded on 5 May 1972.

Overview
The League was expanded, for the second consecutive season, from twenty-two teams to twenty-four teams.

Team changes
The following two clubs joined the League at the start of the season:
Skelmersdale United promoted from Cheshire County League
Ellesmere Port Town promoted from Cheshire County League.

League table

Results

Stadia and locations

Cup results

Challenge Cup

Northern Premier League Shield

Between Champions of NPL Premier Division and Winners of the NPL Cup.

FA Cup

Out of the twenty-two clubs from the Northern Premier League, only three teams reached for the second round:

Second Round

Third Round

FA Trophy

Out of the twenty-two clubs from the Northern Premier League, only Stafford Rangers and Macclesfield Town reached for the fourth round:

Fourth Round

Semi-finals

Final

End of the season
At the end of the fourth season of the Northern Premier League none of the teams put forward for election received enough votes to be promoted to the Football League.  Chorley resigned the league and Kirkby Town was relegated.

Football League elections
Alongside the four Football League teams facing re-election, a total of twelve  non-League teams applied for election, four of which were from the Northern Premier League.  Three out of the four Football League teams were re-elected.  Hereford United from the Southern League replaced Barrow from the Football League as they didn't receive enough votes.  Barrow was subsequently relegated to the Northern Premier League.

Promotion and relegation
The following two clubs left the League at the end of the season:
Chorley resigned, demoted to Cheshire County League
Kirkby Town relegated to Lancashire Combination

The following two clubs joined the League the following season:
Mossley promoted from Cheshire County League
Barrow relegated from Football League Fourth Division.

References

External links
 Northern Premier League official website
 Northern Premier League tables at RSSSF
 Football Club History Database

Northern Premier League seasons
5